Associação Atlética Águas Santas is a professional Handball team based in Maia, Porto District, Portugal. It plays in LPA.

Honours

Unofficial Trophys
Limburgse Handbal Dagen: 1
2013

Portuguese handball clubs
Maia, Portugal